Francisco José Nina Martins Rodrigues dos Santos (born 29 September 1988) is a Portuguese conservative politician and a lawyer. He was elected President of the CDS – People's Party in the National Congress of the Party in Aveiro, with 46% of the votes. In 2018, he was selected as one of the Forbes 30 Under 30 in Europe for law and policy.

Political career 
Rodrigues dos Santos is the eldest of three sons from Coimbra, born to an army officer father and lawyer mother. When he was five, the family moved to Vila Nova da Barquinha in the Santarém District due to his father's work. He studied Law in the Faculty of Law at the University of Lisbon, and is a lawyer and consultant at Valadas Coriel & Associates, a law firm based in Lisbon. He started his political career in the People's Youth, becoming president of the same organisation in 2015. After five years leading the People's Youth, he decided to stand for the leadership of the CDS – People's Party after poor general election results. He now presents himself as the "young conservative".

In the 2013 local elections, he led the PSD-CDS-MPT coalition in the Lisbon parish of Carnide, and was elected. Four years later, he was voted onto the city's municipal assembly as the lead candidate of a CDS-MPT-PPM coalition, and resigned in February 2020. In 2021, he was elected onto the same assembly in Oliveira do Hospital in his native Coimbra District.

He is the youngest of the Portuguese political leaders. He has, however, been unable to assert his authority on the party and his leadership has been challenged various times. After his party was unable to elect a single deputy in the 2022 Portuguese legislative election, Francisco Rodrigues dos Santos announced his resignation from CDS-PP's leadership. He was succeeded by MEP Nuno Melo in April 2022.

During the 2022 election campaign, Rodrigues dos Santos made headlines for a video in which he made an allegory between Christmas dinner and the parties of the Portuguese right: Liberal Initiative was a hipster cousin who shares different values from the rest of the family, Chega was a cousin with poor table manners, and PSD was an absent brother, spending the holiday with his left-wing family.

Personal life
Rodrigues dos Santos befriended the son of the prime minister of Portugal António Costa at university. He is a fan of Sporting CP; when the club were on a 19-year title drought, he likened their fortunes to those of his party. He married Inês Guerra Vargas in 2021.

References 

1988 births
Living people
People from Coimbra
People from Santarém District
CDS – People's Party politicians
University of Lisbon alumni